Gro Kvinlog Genlid (born 8 June 1976) is a Norwegian freestyle skier. She represented Norway in the Women's Ski Cross event at the 2010 Winter Olympics in Vancouver. 

She competed at the 2010 World Cup in ski cross.

She was born in Gjøvik.

References

External links

 Gro Kvinlog Genlid  at the official Vancouver 2010 website

1976 births
Norwegian female freestyle skiers
Olympic freestyle skiers of Norway
Living people
Freestyle skiers at the 2010 Winter Olympics
Sportspeople from Gjøvik
21st-century Norwegian women